Eduardo Cruz Villanueva (born October 6, 1946), most commonly referred to as "Bro. Eddie Villanueva", is an evangelist and president-founder of the Jesus Is Lord Church Worldwide (JILCW).

Villanueva was previously a communist-atheist, radical activist, and street parliamentarian. During martial law, he was imprisoned twice for fighting alongside the oppressed for their rights against land grabbing syndicates.

Villanueva is also the founder of the Philippines for Jesus Movement (PJM), which has more than forty bishops from different Christian churches nationwide as members.

Villanueva was a presidential candidate in the 2004 and 2010 Philippine elections and a senatorial candidate in the 2013 midterm Philippine elections, all as the standard bearer of the Bangon Pilipinas Party.

Villanueva is a radio-TV evangelist owning ZOE Broadcasting Network, a commercial television and radio broadcasting station which owns VHF Channel 11 (A2Z) and UHF Channel 33 (Light TV).

He is also the owner and founder of the Jesus Is Lord Colleges Foundation, Inc. (JILCF), a Christian school in Bocaue, Bulacan, where his wife, Adoracion Villanueva is the school president.

He is currently a member of the 19th Congress of the Philippines and has been a Deputy Speaker of the House of Representatives in the 18th Congress.

Early life 
Villanueva was born on October 6, 1946 in Bocaue, Bulacan to parents Joaquin Villanueva and Maria Cruz. Joaquin Villanueva was a former Olympic sprinter who represented the Philippines in the Far Eastern Games for four consecutive years in 1920s.

Education 
In 1969, Villanueva graduated with a degree in commerce, majoring in economics, from the Philippine College of Commerce (PCC), since renamed the Polytechnic University of the Philippines. He was immersed in both student and labor movements in the 1970s, joining the progressive segments of society which opposed Marcos' dictatorship. Villanueva also took up law at the University of the Philippines but was already into so much activism that he never had time to take the bar examination. During Martial law, he fought local landgrabbers in Bulacan and ended up being jailed twice for his political beliefs and participation in various mass actions.

He worked as a full-time faculty member in the Economics and Finance Department of PCC until 1972. He then worked as the export manager of Maran Export Industries in 1973 and from 1976 to 1977, he was the general manager of the Agape Trading Co. He returned to PCC, now renamed, in 1978 as a part-time professor.

Religious involvement 
According to their church's website, Villanueva claimed to have "had a life-changing encounter with the Lord in 1973 while at the forefront of a leftist movement". At that time, he was also leading his family (and other families) in his home province of Bulacan in an uphill, protracted legal battle as he himself became a victim of a notorious land-grabbing syndicate. Five days after that "dramatic encounter with God", Villanueva was brought face to face with a miracle he could never forget: the land-grabbers were arrested and detained.

On October 5, 1978, Villanueva founded the Jesus Is Lord Church Worldwide formerly named Jesus Is Lord Fellowship, "which started with just 15 members from his Bible studies". In 2007, JIL stated it had "over five million members today in 18 cities in Metro Manila, 80 provinces in the Philippines and 60 countries in the world. Most members abroad are overseas Filipino workers and their families."

On homosexuality 
Villanueva is against same-sex marriage; he said in an interview, "According to the Bible, don't imitate what happened in Sodom and Gomorrah because judgment will befall on the country if it's done".

Political career

2004 presidential bid 

Villanueva campaigned in the 2004 Philippine presidential election.

Despite the polls done by Social Weather Stations and Pulse Asia showing him trailing among the four contenders, Villanueva was confident that he would win the elections saying that "this is why we do not believe in the surveys of the two companies that are usually commissioned by political parties here — because the more than three million human bodies (at my rally) can indicate the real results of the survey."

2010 presidential bid 

Villanueva ran again for the 2010 presidential election where he lost for the second time; he finished fifth out of nine presidential candidates with 1,125,878 votes or 3.12% of the total votes.

2013 Senate bid 

Villanueva ran for a Senate seat in 2013 as a standalone candidate of Bangon Pilipinas. However, he lost, finishing 19th out of the 12 seats up for election with 6,932,985 votes.

Awards and recognitions 
Villanueva was ordained Minister of the Gospel of the Lord Jesus Christ in 1979 by the California-based Victory in Christ Church and International Ministries. He has also been conferred the office of Episcopacy by the Sectarian Body of Christ in the Philippines in April 1996. Two months later, Villanueva received the Gintong Ama (Golden Father) award for Socio-Civic/Religious Sector from the Golden Mother and Father Foundation in June 1996.

In February 2001, Villanueva received the EDSA People Power Freedom Award for ZOE TV 11 for its fair coverage of the People Power II movement. He founded and owns ZOE Broadcasting Network Inc. and operates Channel 11 on Filipino television. Bro. Eddie hosts three ZOE programs, Diyos at Bayan, PJM (Philippines for Jesus Movement) Forum and Jesus The Healer.

Personal life 
He is married to Sis. Adoracion "Dory" Villanueva (died March 10, 2020) and they have four children. His eldest son, Eduardo "Jon-Jon" Villanueva, Jr., is the incumbent mayor of Bocaue, Bulacan. Jonjon was charged with murder for allegedly ordering the shooting of a soldier of the Armed Forces of the Philippines during the May 2007 elections. His other son, Sen. Emmanuel Joel Villanueva, is currently a Senator, Senate Majority Leader, and became the youngest member of the House of Representatives when he took his oath of office as a representative of the CIBAC partylist on February 6, 2002. His daughter, Joni Villanueva-Tugna, was a Christian singer, TV host, and Mayor of Bocaue from July 2016 until her death on May 28, 2020. She was married to Sherwin Tugna, a former CIBAC partylist representative. His other daughter, Edelisha Jovi, is an educator.

References

External links 
 

1946 births
Living people
Candidates in the 2010 Philippine presidential election
Candidates in the 2004 Philippine presidential election
Filipino television evangelists
Filipino Pentecostals
Filipino anti-abortion activists
People from Bulacan
Marcos martial law victims
Former atheists and agnostics
Bangon Pilipinas politicians
RPN News and Public Affairs people
GMA Integrated News and Public Affairs people
20th-century Filipino economists
Polytechnic University of the Philippines alumni
University of the Philippines alumni
Members of the House of Representatives of the Philippines for Citizens' Battle Against Corruption
Deputy Speakers of the House of Representatives of the Philippines